Kurumi Nara was the defending champion, but lost to Zarina Diyas in the quarterfinals.

Diyas won the title, defeating Liang En-shuo in the final, 6–0, 6–2.

Seeds

Draw

Finals

Top half

Bottom half

References

Main Draw

Kangaroo Cup
Kangaroo Cup - Singles
2019 in Japanese tennis